Laois–Offaly (formerly King's County–Queen's County, Leix–Offaly and Laoighis–Offaly) is a parliamentary constituency which is represented in Dáil Éireann, the lower house of the Irish parliament or Oireachtas. The constituency elects 5 deputies (Teachtaí Dála, commonly known as TDs) on the system of proportional representation by means of the single transferable vote (PR-STV). It was previously a constituency from 1921 to 2016.

History and boundaries

Laois–Offaly was created under the Government of Ireland Act 1920 as King's County–Queen's County (the official names of the counties before independence). The two counties were combined in a single four-member constituency for the House of Commons of Southern Ireland. It was known in the Dáil as Leix–Offaly, and first used for the 1921 general election to the Second Dáil. The Sinn Féin candidates elected unopposed preferred to sit in the Second Dáil (1921–22). It was used at every subsequent general election until 2011. It was abolished at the 2016 general election, and was replaced by the new constituencies of Laois and Offaly.

It was re-established by the Electoral (Amendment) (Dáil Constituencies) Act 2017, It replaced the constituencies of Laois and Offaly, where it was defined as: which came into effect at the 2020 general election.

TDs

TDs 1921–2016

TDs since 2020

Elections

2020 general election

2011 general election

2007 general election

2002 general election

1997 general election

1992 general election

1989 general election

1987 general election

1984 by-election
Following the death of Fianna Fáil TD Bernard Cowen, a by-election was held on 14 June 1984, the same day as the European Parliament elections. A Fianna Fáil motion to move the writ in March was defeated by the Fine Gael–Labour government. The seat was won by the Fianna Fáil candidate Brian Cowen, son of the deceased TD.

November 1982 general election

February 1982 general election

1981 general election

1977 general election

1973 general election

1969 general election

1965 general election

1961 general election

1957 general election

1956 by-election
Following the death of Labour Party TD William Davin, a by-election was held on 30 April 1956. The seat was won by the Fianna Fáil candidate Kieran Egan.

1954 general election

1951 general election

1948 general election

1944 general election

1943 general election

1938 general election

1937 general election

1933 general election

1932 general election

September 1927 general election

June 1927 general election

1926 by-election
Following the disqualification of Republican TD Seán McGuinness, a by-election was held on 18 February 1926. The seat was won by the Cumann na nGaedheal candidate James Dwyer.

1923 general election

1922 general election

1921 general election

|}

See also
Dáil constituencies
Politics of the Republic of Ireland
Historic Dáil constituencies
Elections in the Republic of Ireland

References

Historic constituencies in County Laois
Historic constituencies in County Offaly
Dáil constituencies
1921 establishments in Ireland
Constituencies established in 1921
2016 disestablishments in Ireland
Constituencies disestablished in 2016
2020 establishments in Ireland
Constituencies established in 2020